Ugar may refer to:
 Ugar Khurd, town in the state of Karnataka, India
 Ugar Budruk, village in the state of Karnataka, India
 Ugar (river), Bosnia and Herzegovina
 Ugar Island, census locality in the Torres Strait, Queensland, Australia
Stephen Island (Torres Strait) or Ugar, Queensland, Australia